Hydrophis obscurus, commonly known as Russell's sea snake, is a species of venomous sea snake in the family Elapidae.

Distribution
This snake-species is found in the Indian Ocean (India, Myanmar [formerly Burma], Bangladesh) and Thailand. It may also be found in Sri Lanka.

References

Further reading
 Daudin, F.M. 1803. Histoire Naturelle, Générale et Particulière des Reptiles, Volume VII. Dufart. Paris. p. 375.
 Russell, P. 1801. A continuation of an account of Indian serpents: containing descriptions and figures from specimens and drawings, transmitted from various parts of India to the hon. Court of Directors of the East Indian Company. Volume 2. London, W. Bulmer and Co., 53 pp.

obscurus
Reptiles described in 1803